Abdul Khel is a town and union council in the Lakki Marwat District of Khyber Pakhtunkhwa, Pakistan. It is located at 32°23'59N 70°54'49E and has an altitude of 493 metres (1620 feet).

References

Union councils of Lakki Marwat District
Populated places in Lakki Marwat District